Consip S.p.A. is a joint-stock company, set up in 1997, held by the Italian Ministry of economy and finance (MEF), which is the sole shareholder. The company operates in keeping with the MEF’s strategic goals, working exclusively to serve the Public Administration sector.

Consip is a member of the Procurement G6, an informal group leading the use of framework agreements and e-procurement instruments in public procurement.

Corporate profile 
Consip’s mission is to make the use of public resources more efficient and transparent, by providing tools and skills to public administration. The goal is to allow them to perform public purchases and at the same time stimulate a competitive participation of enterprises to public tenders.

Consip obtained the ISO 9001:2008 quality certification for the “design, implementation and launching of framework contracts and e-marketplaces for the procurement of public Goods and Services, in its role as a central purchasing body”.

History 
Consip, under the original name of CON.S.I.P. “Concessionaria Servizi Informativi Pubblici”, was founded in 1997 for the purpose of bringing about changes in IT management for the former Italian Ministry of the treasury, budget, and economic planning.

Through Legislative Decree n. 414 of 19 November 1997, Consip was assigned with ICT activities for Italy’s national public administration in the areas of finance and accounting. Subsequently, through the Decrees of the Ministry of the treasury of 22 December 1997 and 17 June 1998, the company was put in charge of managing and developing ICT  services for said Ministry.

Two years later, Consip was assigned with launching the “Programme for the rationalization of public administration purchases”. In fact, in enforcing the 2000 Budget law, through the Ministerial Decree of 24 February 2000, the Ministry of economy and finance put Consip in charge of assisting the public administrations with their procurement of goods and services.

Over the years, many projects have influenced the development of activities assigned to the company. Today, Consip operates as Italy’s central purchasing body, providing support for individual PAs, and carrying out new tasks assigned through legal provisions and/or administrative acts.

Main activities 
The company carries out activities in consulting, assistance, and support in procuring goods and services for Public Administrations (PAs).

Consip’s activities involve three main areas:
 as central purchasing body, it runs the Programme for the rationalisation of public administration purchases, through the use of ICT and innovative procurement tools: framework contracts, e-marketplace for public administration, framework agreements, dynamic purchasing system, ASP tenders (Central Procurement Area).
 based on specific agreements, it supports the individual PAs in all areas throughout the procurement process (Vertical Procurement Area).
 through legal provisions and/or administrative acts, it develops programmes that make use of its know-how in the area of procurement, as well as its ability to manage complex and innovative projects in the sphere of Public Administration (Other Initiatives Area).

Methodology 
Consip offers consultancy and project-design services, having developed, over time, technical, legal and project management skills.
Consip is a competence centre specialized in all phases of the procurement value chain; it stands beside public administrations both in the procurement strategic planning phase and in the real purchasing phase, by providing e-procurement tools, assistance, and consultancy.
Consip relies on about 340 staff members, with an average age of 43 years. 83% of the employees are university graduates and 51% of them are women.

Board of directors 
Consip's board of directors chronology:

Acknowledgements 
Best Practice in Public Assets Award – 6th year, 2015.
European Energy Service Award - Category “Best European Energy Service Promoter”, 2014.
Ambrogio Lorenzetti Award for Corporate Governance, 2014.
Best Practice in Public Assets Award – 6th year, 2012.
European European eGovernment Award, 2009.
European Public Service Award, 2009.
Best Practice in Public Assets Award – 2nd year, 2008.

See also 
 Government procurement in the European Union
 E-Government
 E-procurement
 Public procurement

References

External links 

Ministry of economy and finance
Consip e-procurement platform

Government-owned companies of Italy
Companies based in Rome
Italian companies established in 1997
Public eProcurement